Eolus Von Rettig (July 6, 1908 – April 29, 1983) was an American football coach. He served as the head football coach at Texas College in Tyler, Texas from 1936 to 1941, Texas Southern University in Houston from 1946 to 1948, and Wiley College in Marshall, Texas from 1949 to 1951. He later served as an assistant coach at Prairie View A&M University.

Rettig played college football at Wilberforce College—now known as Wilberforce University—in Wilberforce, Ohio as a guard. He served as line coach at Texas College from 1934 to 1935 under Ace Mumford before succeeding Mumford as head football coach in 1936. Rettig also played football at Bishop College in Marshall, Texas in the late 1920s when Mumford was head coach there.

Rettig died on April 29, 1983, at St. Paul's Hospital in Dallas.

Head coaching record

Football

References

External links
 

1908 births
1983 deaths
American football guards
Bishop Tigers football players
Prairie View A&M Panthers baseball coaches
Prairie View A&M Panthers football coaches
Texas College Steers football coaches
Texas Southern Tigers football coaches
Wiley Wildcats football coaches
Wilberforce Bulldogs football players
African-American coaches of American football
African-American players of American football
African-American baseball coaches
20th-century African-American sportspeople